Hexasepalum teres  is a species of flowering plant in the coffee family known by the common names poorjoe and rough buttonweed. This annual plant is native to Mexico, Central America, South America, the West Indies and the United States from California to Florida and from Kansas to Massachusetts. The species is also naturalized in the Netherlands, the Canary Islands, Western Africa, Angola, China, Japan and Korea, India, and Madagascar.

Each pair of leaves cradles a flower at its base. The fruit is ellipsoid, splitting into two nutlets This plant is most common in sandy areas such as desert dunes and river floodplains.

References

External links
 Jepson Manual Treatment
 
 

Spermacoceae
Flora of Central America
Flora of the Caribbean
Flora of South America
Flora of Mexico
Flora of the United States
Plants described in 1788
Taxa named by John Kunkel Small
Flora without expected TNC conservation status